The cinnamon-faced tyrannulet (Phylloscartes parkeri) is a species of bird in the family Tyrannidae.
It is found in the Yungas of Peru and Bolivia. First described in 1997, it was named in honor of Theodore A. Parker III.

References

cinnamon-faced tyrannulet
Birds of the Yungas
cinnamon-faced tyrannulet
Taxonomy articles created by Polbot